Queensland Rams compete in the Claxton Shield Baseball Championship in Australia. The Rams were one of the founding teams of the Claxton Shield in 1934 and competed as Queensland until 1988. Between 1988 and 1999, the Claxton Shield was awarded to the winner of the Australian Baseball League. In 1999, the Rams were invited to join the International Baseball League of Australia in which they competed for 2 seasons (1999-2000 and 2002). After this point, the Claxton Shield reverted to a competition similar to that of 1988.

History

Diamond All-Star Team
On 2 December 2008 Baseball Queensland released in honour of the 75th anniversary of the Claxton Shield, an All-Star team. Nominees must have played in at least one Claxton Shield competition between 1934 and 2008. This includes all ABL competition between 1990 and 1999 where the Claxton Shield continued to be awarded to the ABL Champion each year.
Teams consist of 10 position players (maximum of one player per position, plus one DH and one utility), eight pitchers, one manager and three assistant coaches.

2010 Claxton Shield squad

Queensland Ram's 30-man roster for the 2010 Claxton Shield. The active roster is for the series against New South Wales Patriots.

References

Claxton Shield
Baseball teams in Australia
Rams
Baseball teams established in 1939
Sporting clubs in Brisbane